The Gozo Phoenician shipwreck is a seventh-century-BC shipwreck of a Phoenician trade ship lying at a depth of . The wreck was discovered in 2007 by a team of French scientists during a sonar survey off the coast of Malta's Gozo island.

Historical background 

The Phoenicians, a thalassocratic people known for trading and shipbuilding, had a long-standing presence in, and influence on the history of, the Maltese islands. From the middle of the second millennium BC, the Phoenicians undertook seaborne traffic from their mainland cities on the coast of modern-day Lebanon; their far-reaching trade routes spanned from the British Isles  to Mesopotamia. The Phoenicians built trade outposts and colonies throughout the Mediterranean to facilitate the supply and storage of raw materials and goods. Sometime after 1000 BC, Phoenician traders colonized the Maltese islands that were conveniently located at the center of the Mediterranean between Europe and North Africa. They inhabited the area now known as Mdina and its surrounding town of Rabat which they called Maleth. The area came under the control of Carthage after the fall of Tyre in 332 BC. Punic influence remained on the Maltese islands during the early Roman era, as demonstrated by the famous second century BC Cippi of Melqart that were pivotal in deciphering the Phoenician language.

Phoenician shipwrecks 
There are about six Phoenician shipwreck sites datable from the eighth to the sixth century BC in the Mediterranean. Two of these are located off the coast of Palestine/Israel, at a depth of ~, three in shallow waters facing the Spanish coast and one in France.

Location and discovery 
Further archaeological research off the coast of Malta was conducted by the ANR's GROPLAN project in collaboration with the University of Malta and Texas A&M University.

Description 
Quern-stones, used to grind grains, were stored at both ends of the ship; they were discovered in pristine condition, indicating that they were never used and were destined for trade. Studies show that the grinding stones were made from volcanic rock sourced in Pantelleria in Sicily. The wreck site is very well-preserved, save for some minor damage caused by local fishermen's bottom-fishing techniques.

Cargo and artifacts 
Digital mapping and high resolution imaging of the site and of the visible artifacts was done in 2014 by an international team of scientists. The survey was performed using a manned submarine that was deployed to produce a 3D photogrammetric image, which helped identify at least seven types of ceramic vessels. In 2016–2017, exploration of the wreckage resulted in the recovery of 12 objects, including uniquely shaped urns that appear to have been made on the island of Gozo. Divers supervised by maritime archeologists from the Department of Classics and Archaeology at the University of Malta also recovered six intact ceramic objects numerous ceramic shards, among which were Tyrrhenian-style amphorae typical of Italy and western Sicily.

Artifact recovery challenges 
The extraction of artifacts from other parts of the ship proved difficult due to the depth of the shipwreck site. To facilitate artifact surfacing, a mooring dead weight was sunk to anchor the researcher's ship close to the shipwreck site. It took experienced divers eight minutes to reach the site, where they could stay for no longer than 14 minutes; surfacing objects took an additional two and a half hours.

Conservation 
In June 2021, Maltese culture minister José Herrera discussed options to lift the shipwreck from the bottom of the sea, and exhibit it at the planned Gozo Museum or another, standalone museum. Another option the minister discussed is to leave the ship in place as an underwater tourist attraction.

See also 
 Archaeology of shipwrecks
 Marsala Ship
 Uluburun shipwreck

References

External links 
 L'Università ta' Malta – Phoenician shipwreck project | Exploring the Phoenician Shipwreck off the coast of Xlendi. Gozo
 http://www.lsis.org/groplan/article/art_Xlendi.html

Ancient shipwrecks
Shipwrecks in the Mediterranean Sea
Archaeological discoveries in Malta
2007 archaeological discoveries
Shipwrecks of Malta
Gozo
2007 in Malta
Phoenician shipwrecks
Phoenician pottery
Trade in Phoenicia